This list of churches in Sorø Municipality lists church buildings in Sorø Municipality, Denmark.

List

See also
 Listed buildings in Sorø Municipality

References

External links

 Nordens kirker: Sydøstsjælland

 
Soro